Lou Mogul (c. 1909 – January 4, 1966) was a Canadian football player who played for the Winnipeg Blue Bombers, Montreal Alouettes, and Edmonton Eskimos. He won the Grey Cup with Winnipeg in 1935, 1939 and 1941. He played college football at North Dakota State University.

References

1900s births
1966 deaths
American football guards
American football tackles
Canadian football guards
Canadian football tackles
Canadian players of American football
North Dakota State Bison football players
Winnipeg Blue Bombers players
Montreal Alouettes players
Edmonton Elks players
Players of Canadian football from Manitoba
Canadian football people from Winnipeg